A tumbler is a flat-floored beverage container usually made of plastic, glass or stainless steel.

Theories vary as to the etymology of the word tumbler.  One such theory is that the glass originally had a pointed or convex base and could not be set down without spilling.  Another is that they had weighted bottoms which caused them to right themselves if knocked over.
 Collins glass, for a tall mixed drink
 Dizzy Cocktail glass, a glass with a wide, shallow bowl, comparable to a normal cocktail glass but without the stem
 Highball glass, for mixed drinks
 Iced tea glass
 Juice glass, for fruit juices and vegetable juices. 
 Old fashioned glass, traditionally, for a simple cocktail or liquor "on the rocks". Contemporary American "rocks" glasses may be much larger, and used for a variety of beverages over ice
 Shot glass, a small glass for up to four ounces of liquor. The modern shot glass has a thicker base and sides than the older whiskey glass
 Table glass, faceted glass, or granyonyi stakan, common in Russia and made of particularly hard and thick glass
 Water glass
 Whiskey tumbler, a small, thin-walled glass for a straight shot of liquor

Political

 The Jana Sena Party from India has been assigned a glass tumbler as a common election symbol.

References

Drinkware